Andrea Louise Martin (born January 15, 1947) is an American-Canadian actress, singer, and comedian, best known for her work in the television series SCTV and Great News. She has appeared in films such as Black Christmas (1974), Wag the Dog (1997), Hedwig and the Angry Inch (2001), My Big Fat Greek Wedding (2002), My Big Fat Greek Wedding 2 (2016), and Little Italy (2018). She has also lent her voice to the animated films Anastasia (1997), The Rugrats Movie (1998), and Jimmy Neutron: Boy Genius (2001).

Martin has been equally prolific in the world of theater, winning Tony Awards for both My Favorite Year and the 2013 revival of Pippin. Martin also appeared on Broadway in Candide, Oklahoma!, Fiddler on the Roof, Young Frankenstein, Exit the King, and Act One. She has received five nominations for the Tony Award for Best Featured Actress in a Musical, more than any other actress in the award's history. She received her first nomination for the Tony Award for Best Featured Actress in a Play for the 2016 revival of Noises Off.

Early life
Andrea Martin was born on January 15, 1947, in Portland, Maine, the eldest of three children of Sybil A. (née Manoogian) and John Papazian Martin (1917–2010). Her paternal grandparents were Armenian immigrants from Van, present-day Turkey who escaped the Armenian Genocide. Her maternal grandmother immigrated to the U.S. at the age of 15. Her grandfather, an amateur thespian, changed the family's name from Papazian to Martin. Her maternal grandparents, who were from Constantinople, started the Armenian School at the Chestnut Street Church. Andrea's father owned Martin's Foods, a grocery-store chain. She has mentioned that although her grandparents "did not know what assimilation was," her parents worked very hard to assimilate into the U.S. As such, Martin only started connecting with her ancestral identity later in life.

When she was two years old, her mother's leg had broken, so she would often read to her daughter. She and her mother would often take turns reading Shakespeare, Paul Revere's Ride, and Edgar Allan Poe’s The Raven. She took piano lessons when she was eight, reciting a poem about a kitten at the rotunda of the Portland Art Museum and played the piano there. Martin transferred from Nathan Clifford School to St. Joseph’s Academy before entering high school. She graduated from Deering High School in 1965, where she was a member of the Dramatic Club and won Miss Deering High 1965.

Career
Soon after graduating from Emerson College, Martin won a role in a touring company of You're a Good Man, Charlie Brown. After frequent visits to Toronto, she relocated from New York City to Toronto in 1970 and immediately found steady work in television, film, and theater.

In 1972, Martin played the character Robin in a Toronto production of Godspell, with a company that included future stars Gilda Radner, Martin Short, Eugene Levy, and Victor Garber, and musical director Paul Shaffer. Two of her early film roles were in horror films, 1973's Cannibal Girls, for which she won the Sitges Film Festival Award for Best Actress, and in 1974, as the bookish sorority sister Phyllis in Black Christmas, a Canadian slasher.

In 1976, she joined then-unknowns John Candy, Dave Thomas, Eugene Levy, Catherine O'Hara, Harold Ramis, and Joe Flaherty on the Canadian sketch comedy television series, SCTV, which was set at fictional television station "Second City Television", or SCTV, in Melonville. Martin most notably portrayed leopard print-wearing station manager Edith Prickley, whose dealings with the staff, including president/owner Guy Caballero, clueless newscaster Earl Camembert, and washed-up actor Johnny LaRue, helped to provide much of the show's humor. Other notable characters Martin played included  Pirini Scleroso, an immigrant from Eastern Europe, organ saleswoman Edna Boil, feminist TV show host Libby Wolfson, and children's entertainer Mrs. Falbo. Her talent for impersonation was key in her humorous portrayals of Barbra Streisand, Ethel Merman, Arlene Francis, Pauline Kael, Sally Field, Sophia Loren, Beverly Sills, Lynn Redgrave, Linda Lavin, Bernadette Peters, Liza Minnelli, Connie Francis, Mother Teresa, Joni Mitchell, Alice B. Toklas, Patti Smith, Brenda Vaccaro, and Indira Gandhi. In 1981, Martin was Emmy-nominated for Outstanding Supporting Actress in a Variety Show for her work in SCTV.

Her 1970s stage work eventually included the Toronto branch of the improvisational comedy troupe The Second City, a group which produced almost the entire cast of SCTV. In 1992, she made her Broadway debut in the musical My Favorite Year, for which she won the Tony Award, Theatre World Award, and Drama Desk Award for Best Featured Actress in a Musical.

Her additional Broadway credits include Candide (1997) and Oklahoma! (2002), and the Broadway premiere of Young Frankenstein (2007), all of which brought her Tony Award nominations for Best Featured Actress in a Musical.

Martin starred alongside Geoffrey Rush and Susan Sarandon in the Broadway revival of Exit the King. For her performance as Juliette, she was nominated for a Drama Desk and an Outer Critics Circle Award. She wrote and performed in the critically acclaimed one-woman show Nude, Nude, Totally Nude in Los Angeles and New York City, receiving a 1996 Drama Desk Award for Outstanding One Person Show.

Her other theater credits include the leads in The Rose Tattoo and Betty's Summer Vacation, for which she won the Elliot Norton Award for Best Actress, both produced at the Huntington Theatre in Boston. During the winter of 2012–2013, she played Berthe, Pippin's grandmother, in the American Repertory Theater production of Pippin in Cambridge, Massachusetts, singing the classic song "No Time At All". The show transferred to Broadway at the Music Box Theatre and opened in April 2013. For Pippin Martin won the Drama Desk Award for Outstanding Featured Actress in a Musical, the Outer Critics Circle Award for Best Featured Actress in a Musical and the Tony Award for Best Featured Actress in a Musical. Martin's last performance as Berthe in the Broadway production of Pippin was on September 22, 2013. She appeared on Broadway in the new play written and directed by James Lapine, Act One, for which she received the Outer Critics Circle Award.

Martin played Wanda Falbo the Word Fairy in a series of short segments on Sesame Street, debuting in 1989. The character was based on Mrs. Falbo, one of Martin's SCTV characters. She also appeared on Kate & Allie as the executive producer of a low-rated cable channel, which was spun-off into her own CBS series, Roxie. Martin is known to Star Trek fans as one of two actresses to play Ishka, Quark's iconoclastic mother on Star Trek: Deep Space Nine. For her role, she was made up to appear as an older woman, although in reality, Martin is less than three years older than Armin Shimerman, who played Quark.

Martin has won two Emmy Awards for Outstanding Writing in a Variety or Music Program in 1982 and 1983. She has done considerable voice work in animated film and television productions such as Anastasia, The Adventures of Jimmy Neutron: Boy Genius, The Grim Adventures of Billy and Mandy, Rugrats as Aunt Miriam, The Secret of NIMH 2: Timmy to the Rescue as Muriel - Floyd's wife, The Simpsons (as Apu's mother), Recess as Lunchlady Harriet, the 1999 version of The Woody Woodpecker Show, Earthworm Jim, Kim Possible, The Buzz On Maggie, SpongeBob SquarePants, and Brother Bear 2. She also appeared in the 1993 television adaptation of Gypsy starring Bette Midler.

In 1997, Martin starred in the television series Life... and Stuff.

Her screen credits include All Over the Guy, in which she played Dr. Ellen Wyckoff—Dan Bucatinsky's therapist mother, Club Paradise, Wag the Dog, All I Want for Christmas, Worth Winning, Hedwig and the Angry Inch, Stepping Out, The Producers, and My Big Fat Greek Wedding, in which she portrayed Aunt Voula, a role she reprised in the small-screen adaptation, My Big Fat Greek Life, and the 2016 sequel, My Big Fat Greek Wedding 2. In 2006, she played a major role in the remake of Black Christmas. She played Helaine in the 2009 breakout independent film Breaking Upwards. In the episode titled Pupil, she played an emergency room patient on the Showtime series, Nurse Jackie, which was aired July 27, 2009. In 2012, she provided the voice of Penny in the American Dad! episode "Stan's Best Friend" and appeared in an episode of 30 Rock titled "My Whole Life Is Thunder." Martin appeared in Night at the Museum 3 and Hulu's original series, Difficult People, starring Billy Eichner and Julie Klausner, and produced by Amy Poehler. It premiered August 5, 2015.  She played Prudy Pingleton on Hairspray Live!, which aired on December 7, 2016.

She appears in the NBC sitcom Working the Engels.

Martin recently performed as Dotty Otley in the limited-run Roundabout Theatre Company revival of Noises Off, directed by Jeremy Herrin. Martin was nominated for the Tony Award for Best Featured Actress in a Play for her performance.

Martin tours throughout Canada and the United States in her one-woman show, Andrea Martin: Final Days, Everything Must Go! with her musical director Seth Rudetsky.

In 2018, Martin, along with fellow Canadians Seth Rogen and Leonard Cohen, was inducted into Canada's Walk of Fame.

Martin was set to perform on Broadway opposite Nathan Lane beginning March 2019 in the world premiere of Taylor Mac's new comedy Gary: A Sequel to Titus Andronicus, directed by George C. Wolfe. On March 4, 2019,  Martin was announced to be withdrawing from the production, having broken four ribs in an accident during rehearsal.

Personal life
Martin divides her time between Los Angeles and Toronto. On December 8, 2017, on The Marilyn Denis Show, Martin announced that after 47 years in Canada, she had become a Canadian citizen. She was previously married to Bob Dolman and had two sons with him, Joe and Jack. She has a grandchild via her eldest son. Through her marriage to Dolman, she was the sister-in-law of actor/comedian Martin Short, who married Dolman’s sister Nancy.

Filmography

Film

Television

Awards and nominations

Film and TV

Theatre

Published works

References

External links

 
 
 

Living people
20th-century American actresses
20th-century Canadian actresses
21st-century American actresses
21st-century Canadian actresses
21st-century American women writers
Actresses from Portland, Maine
Actresses from Toronto
American expatriates in Canada
American film actresses
21st-century American memoirists
American musical theatre actresses
American people of Armenian descent
Canadian people of Armenian descent
American television actresses
American voice actresses
American women comedians
Drama Desk Award winners
Primetime Emmy Award winners
Tony Award winners
Emerson College alumni
American women memoirists
Writers from Portland, Maine
Writers from Toronto
Comedians from Maine
Comedians from Toronto
20th-century American comedians
21st-century American comedians
1947 births